Kadakola  is a Town and a suburb of Mysuru metropolitan area in the southern state of Karnataka, India. It is located in the Mysore taluk of Mysore district. In November 2020, Kadakola was upgraded from a Gram Panchayat to a Town Panchayat and a gazetted notification was passed on November 26, 2020.2. The combined population of the newly formed town is 19,969.

Demographics
The newly formed town had a population of 19,315. The population breakdown is given below.

Post office
There is a post office at Kadakola and the postal code is 571311.

Transportation
There is a small railway station at Kadakola where only slow trains to Mysore and Chamarajanagar stop. This railway station is part of Mysore-Chamarajanagar branch line.  Buses are available to Mysore city which is 14.7 km away. The nearest airport is Mysuru airport at mandakalli which is 8 km away. The railway station also serves as a logistics hotspot with Inland Container Depot being built. Mysuru Airport is located in Mandakalli of Kadakola Town Panchayat.

Villages and suburbs

Thandavapura (3 km), Sinduvalli (3 km), Someshwarapura (4 km), Devalapura (6 km), Hosahundi (7 km) are the nearby villages. Other nearby villages are 
Kongara, Nanjaianahundi, Beeregowdana hundi and Kardimarayana hundi.

Image gallery

See also
 Mysore
 Nanjangud
 Chamarajanagar
 Mysore–Chamarajanagar branch line

References

External links

Villages in Mysore district